The Poole Baronetcy, of Poole in the County of Chester, was a title in the Baronetage of England. It was created on 25 October 1677 for James Poole. The title became extinct on the death of the fifth Baronet in 1821.

Poole baronets, of Poole (1677)
Sir James Poole, 1st Baronet (–)
Sir Francis Poole, 2nd Baronet (–1763)
Sir Henry Poole, 3rd Baronet (died 1767)
Sir Ferdinando Poole, 4th Baronet (died 1804), High Sheriff of Sussex
Sir Henry Poole, 5th Baronet (1744–1821)

References

Extinct baronetcies in the Baronetage of England
1677 establishments in England